Stropharia ambigua, sometimes known as the questionable Stropharia, is a saprotrophic agaric mushroom, commonly fruiting in leaf litter and wood chips in the Pacific Northwest.

Description
The cap is  broad, obtuse to convex, becoming flat or uplifted in age; it has a smooth surface, is slimy when moist, and yellowish. The edge may have bits of white veil hanging from it. The flesh is white, thick, and soft. The gills are pale gray and gradually darkens to purplish-gray or purplish-black. The gills occasionally pull away from the stipe with age. It may have bits of white veil hanging from it and, less commonly, a brittle ring. The veil is soft and white. The spore print is dark purplish to nearly black. The species fruits in the spring and fall. It does not have a volva. The species has been said to taste like old leaves.

Edibility
Alexander Hanchett Smith and Nancy S. Weber state that the species is not poisonous. Contrarily, one source regards it as possibly poisonous. Because of conflicting reports on its edibility, the authors David Arora, Orson K. Miller, Jr. and Hope Miller do not recommend eating the species.

Distribution and habitat
Stropharia ambigua appears in late fall as a solitary to scattered mushroom or in groups on rich humus, usually under conifers. It can also be found with alder and other hardwoods in the Pacific Coast. It has frequently been found in disturbed areas, such as where wood was handled. The species will colonize outdoor mushroom beds after wood chips have been decomposed by a primary saprotroph. It favors a cold and damp environment.

Similar species 
Similar species include Stropharia aeruginosa, S. coronilla, S. riparia, and S. semiglobata.

References

External links
 
 Stropharia ambigua

Strophariaceae
Fungi described in 1898
Fungi of North America
Taxa named by Charles Horton Peck